Health surveillance may refer to:

 Public health surveillance
 Workplace health surveillance

Health economics